Frederick Francis Dawson (19 June 1917 – 27 April 1986) was a New Zealand cricketer.

Born in Timaru, Dawson played three first class matches for Canterbury in the 1950–51 season. He died, age 68, in Christchurch.

References 

1917 births
1986 deaths
Cricketers from Timaru
New Zealand cricketers
Canterbury cricketers